Danièle Lebrun (born 24 July 1937) is a French actress.

Theater

Filmography

References

External links
 

1937 births
Living people
French film actresses
French stage actresses
People from Ardèche
20th-century French actresses
21st-century French actresses
French National Academy of Dramatic Arts alumni
Signatories of the 1971 Manifesto of the 343